Francis Martin "Franny" Firth (27 May 1956 – 21 May 2018) was an English professional footballer who played as a winger for Huddersfield Town, Halifax Town and Bury in the Football League and for Witton Albion in non-league football.

References

1956 births
2018 deaths
Association football wingers
Bury F.C. players
English Football League players
English footballers
Footballers from Dewsbury
Halifax Town A.F.C. players
Huddersfield Town A.F.C. players
Witton Albion F.C. players